The 1990 Fife Regional Council election, the fifth election to the Fife Regional Council, was held on 3 May 1990 as part of the wider 1990 Scottish regional elections. The election saw Labour maintaining their control of the region's 46 seat council.

Aggregate results

Ward results

References

1990 Scottish local elections
1990
May 1990 events in the United Kingdom